was a Japanese freestyle swimmer. He was part of the Japanese teams that set a world record in 1963 and won an Olympic bronze medal in 1964 in the 4 × 200 m freestyle relay. In 1964 he also finished fourth in the 4 × 100 m freestyle relay and fifth in the 4 × 100 m medley relay.

Okabe died of pneumonia in Tokyo on January 26, 2018, at the age of 76.

References

1941 births
2018 deaths
Olympic swimmers of Japan
Olympic bronze medalists for Japan
Swimmers at the 1964 Summer Olympics
World record setters in swimming
Olympic bronze medalists in swimming
Japanese male freestyle swimmers
Medalists at the 1964 Summer Olympics
Deaths from pneumonia in Japan
20th-century Japanese people